The Women's snowboard halfpipe competition at the FIS Freestyle Ski and Snowboarding World Championships 2023 was held on 1 and 3 March 2023.

Qualification
The qualification was started on 1 March at 09:40. The eight best snowboarders qualified for the final.

Final
The final was started on 3 March at 10:00.

References

Women's snowboard halfpipe